2016 State Basketball League season may refer to:

2016 MSBL season, Men's SBL season
2016 WSBL season, Women's SBL season